Knysna Yacht Club, or simply the KYC, is a sailing club located in town of Knysna, on the Indian Ocean coast of South Africa.

History
The Club was founded on 31 August 1910 by a handful of sailing enthusiasts.

Some of the founder members 
Ascheton Geddes DE Smidt -First Commodore
AV Cooke
WP Cuthbert
EL Dudley
George Rex Duthie
JC Duthie
JJ Duthie
WA Duthie
J Rex Metlerkamp
The first clubhouse was completed in December 1911 and at a cost of £176.10.0d . The clubhouse was built from yellowwood.

General
The Yacht Club is well known for its hospitality and world-class facilities. Sailors passing through the Heads have a safe navigable lagoon in which to moor their yachts while visiting Knysna and the surrounding region.

References 
(2010). Knysna Yacht Club 100 years of maritime Tradition, SamIam.

External links 
 Knysna Yacht Club website

Knysna
Yacht clubs in South Africa
1910 establishments in South Africa
Sailing in South Africa
Sport in KwaZulu-Natal
Sports clubs established in 1910